Greta Hall is a house in Keswick in the Lake District of England.  It is best known as the home of the poets Samuel Taylor Coleridge and Robert Southey.

Overview
The official address of Greta Hall is Main Street, Keswick, but it is located some 150 metres to the north east of the road on higher ground. The house is described by Historic England:

Notable tenants and visitors

The poet Samuel Taylor Coleridge lived at Greta Hall with his family from 24 July 1800 until 1803 and regularly visited William Wordsworth in Grasmere. Coleridge's daughter Sara was born at Greta Hall in 1802. Robert Southey and his wife came to stay with the Coleridges in 1803, and took over the tenancy of Greta Hall when Coleridge left in 1804. Southey lived there until his death in 1843.

Greta Hall was visited by a number of the Lake Poets and other literary figures including William Wordsworth, Dorothy Wordsworth, William Hazlitt, Lord Byron, John Keats, Percy Bysshe Shelley, Sir Walter Scott, Sir George Beaumont, Charles Lamb and Mary Lamb 1802, Thomas De Quincey and John Ruskin. On July 5, 1877 Pedro II, the Emperor of Brazil, and his wife Empress Teresa Cristina arrived in Keswick from Scotland anxious to see the memorials of Robert Southey, of whose "History of Brazil" he is said to have spoken with gratification. Entering Crosthwaite Church, he inspected the monument to the poet, reading the inscription on it by Wordsworth, and after visiting the Laureate's grave in the churchyard, went over to Greta Hall.

Later times

Between 1872 and 1887 it was a girls’ school. In 1909 it was bought by Canon Rawnsley and rented to the headmaster of Keswick School as a girls’ boarding house. In 1921 it was bought by the governors of the school and remained a girls’ boarding house until 1994.

See also

Dove Cottage
Rydal Mount
Wordsworth House

References

Sources

External links
 Greta Hall Keswick home of Robert Southey

Grade I listed buildings in Cumbria
Houses in Cumbria
Keswick, Cumbria
Robert Southey
Samuel Taylor Coleridge